Chotian Kalan is a small village of Moga district, in Punjab, India. Its population is about 1500. There is one primary school, five peer jagah, and two Gurudwara Sahib. In this village, people are from Gen SC category. All the houses have only one floor (due to some vachan said by peer Baba).

References

Villages in Moga district